Charcoal filter can refer to:

 Activated charcoal, used as a filter
 Charcoal Filter, a Japanese rock band